In economics, shrinkflation, also known as the grocery shrink ray, deflation, or package downsizing, is the process of items shrinking in size or quantity, or even sometimes reformulating or reducing quality, while their prices remain the same or increase. The word is a portmanteau of the words shrink and inflation. First usage of the term "shrinkflation" with its current meaning has been attributed to the economist Pippa Malmgren, though the same term had been used earlier by historian Brian Domitrovic to refer to an economy shrinking while also suffering high inflation.

Shrinkflation allows companies to increase their operating margin and profitability by reducing costs whilst maintaining sales volume, and is often used as an alternative to raising prices in line with inflation. Consumer protection groups are critical of the practice.

Economic definition 

Shrinkflation is a rise in the general price level of goods per unit of weight or volume, brought about by a reduction in the weight or size of the item sold. The price for one piece of the packaged product remains the same or could even be raised. This sometimes does not affect inflation measures such as the consumer price index or Retail Price Index, i.e. it might not increase in the cost of a basket of retail goods and services, but many indicators of price levels and thus inflation are linked to units of volume or weight of products, so that shrinkflation also affects the statistically represented inflation figures.

Consumer impact
Consumer advocates are critical of shrinkflation because it has the effect of reducing product value by "stealth". The reduction in pack size is sufficiently small as not to be immediately obvious to regular consumers. An unchanged price means that consumers are not alerted to the higher unit price. The practice adversely affects consumers' ability to make informed buying choices. Consumers have been found to be deterred more by rises in prices than by reductions in pack sizes. Suppliers and retailers have been called upon to be upfront with customers. According to Ratula Chakraborty, a professor of business management, they should be legally obliged to notify shoppers when pack sizes have been reduced. Corporate bodies deflect attention from product shrinkage with "less is more" messaging, for example by claiming health benefits of smaller portions or environmental benefits of less packaging.

Instances of shrinkflation

 In 2010, Kraft reduced its 200g Toblerone bar to 170g.
 Coffee sold in 1 lb (453.6g) bags shrank to 400g or smaller in the 1980s
 Tetley tea bags were sold in boxes of 88 instead of 100.
 Nestlé reduced its After Eight Mint Chocolate Thins box from 200g to 170g.
 Cadbury's Crunchie were sold in packs of three instead of four.
 In 2003, Dannon shrunk its yogurt containers from 8 ounces to 6 ounces.
 In January 2009, Häagen-Dazs announced that it would be reducing the size of their ice cream cartons in the US from 16 US fl oz (470 ml) to 14 US fl oz (410 ml).
 Birds Eye potato waffles were reduced from a 12 pack to a 10 pack
In 2015, Cadbury Fingers removed two fingers from each pack, reducing the weight of a pack from 125 grams to 111 grams.
 In July 2015, a tub of Cadbury Roses which weighed 975g in 2011, was reduced to under 730g, while a tub of Cadbury Heroes was reduced 695g. However the price remained the same at around £9.
 In 2016, Mondelez International again reduced the size of the UK 170g Toblerone bar to 150g, while the 400g bar was reduced to 360g. This was done by enlarging the gap between the chocolate triangles.
 In 2017, Milka Alpine Milk and Milka Nuts & Raisins got reduced from 300 g to 270 g while Triolade got reduced from 300 g to 280 g, all without changing the bag size.
 In 2017, McVities reduced the number of Jaffa Cakes in every standard packet from 12 to 10, raising the cost per cake from 9.58p to 9.9p
 In 2018, Koopmans reduced the weight of their buckwheat flour packages by 20% from 500g to 400g - claiming 'renewed' on the package, without specifying that 'renewed' only meant that less product was provided. It is unknown whether wholesale prices were affected, while it is certain that retail pricing remained exactly the same.
 In 2020, Unilever reduced the size of Ben & Jerry's ice-cream tubs in Europe, going from 500ml to 465ml, whilst still retaining the RRP of around 5 euros. Despite this, Unilever has publicly criticized rival ice-cream brands for shrinkflation in the United States, where Ben & Jerry's ice-cream is still sold in pint-sized (473ml) tubs.
 In 2021, Sainsbury's replaced their 80g Spicy Thai Crackers with a 40g packet, but the price was less than halved resulting in a by-weight price increase of over 15%.
 In 2021, General Mills shrunk their family-sized boxes of cereal down from 19.3 ounces to 18.1 ounces. That means the unit cost per ounce of the product has increased, but for the consumer, the average price in the United States remained $2.99 and the amount of cereal in the box looks pretty much the same to the consumer.
 In 2022, Procter & Gamble reduced the number of double-ply sheets per roll of toilet paper from 264 to 244 sheets in the 18-count mega package. This amounts to approximately a roll and a half in the 18-count package.

Skimpflation
In October 2021, NPR's Planet Money proposed the term skimpflation to refer to a degradation in the quality of services while keeping the price constant, such as a hotel offering a more meager breakfast or reducing the frequency of housekeeping.

See also
 Purchasing power
 Real versus nominal value (economics)
 Deflation
 Inflation
 "The Grocery Shrink Ray"

References

External links
 shrinkflation.info A website in Japanese explaining how hundreds of well-known products have been reduced in size, how much have been reduced and when they were reduced.
 The impact of Shrinkflation on the CPIH: January 2012 to June 2017
 Shrinkflation – the economics of stealing from customers

Inflation
Deception